Governor Fitzgerald may refer to:

Charles Fitzgerald (1791–1887), Governor of The Gambia from 1844 to 1847 and Governor of Western Australia from 1848 to 1855
Frank Fitzgerald (1885–1939), Governor of Michigan from 1935 to 1939
John Fitzgerald (governor), Governor of Tangier during the 1660s